Batali may refer to:

Batali River, a river of Dominica
Batali Hill, a hill in Chittagong, Bangladesh

People with the surname
Mario Batali (born 1960), American chef, writer, restaurateur and media personality
Muki Batali, South Sudanese politician

See also
Batalin